This list of tallest buildings in Morocco ranks buildings in the country by their official height.

Tallest buildings

Buildings less than 100 metres

Buildings under construction

On-hold, approved or proposed

See also 

 List of tallest structures in Morocco
 List of tallest skyscrapers in Morocco
 List of tallest buildings in Rabat

References

External links

Morocco
Morocco
Tallest